Sandeep Kunchikor (born 12 March 1984) is an Indian cricketer. He made his first-class debut for Kurunegala Youth Cricket Club in Tier B of the 2019–20 Premier League Tournament in Sri Lanka on 31 January 2020.

References

External links
 

1984 births
Living people
Indian cricketers
Kurunegala Youth Cricket Club cricketers
Cricketers from Mumbai